Englewood is an unincorporated community in Lawrence County, in the U.S. state of South Dakota.

History
Englewood was first called Ten-Mile Ranch. It was originally a stagecoach stop in the late 1870s, and the name changed when it became a railroad center. A post office called Englewood was established in 1892, and remained in operation until 1943. The community most likely was named after Englewood, Chicago.

References

Unincorporated communities in Lawrence County, South Dakota
Unincorporated communities in South Dakota